Thegabakha Ward also known as Officers' Hill is a ward located under Nagaland's capital city, Kohima. The ward falls under the designated Ward No. 10 of the Kohima Municipal Council.

Education
Educational Institutions in Thegabakha Ward:

Schools 
 Thegabakha Government Primary School

See also
 Municipal Wards of Kohima

References

External links
 Map of Kohima Ward No. 10

Kohima
Wards of Kohima